William Frederic Pendleton (March 25, 1845 – November 5, 1927) was the first Executive Bishop of the General Church of the New Jerusalem, in Bryn Athyn, Pennsylvania.

Biography
Born in Savannah, Georgia, Pendleton was the son of Major Philip Coleman Pendleton and Catherine Sarah Melissa Tabeau. He became the first Executive Bishop of the General Church of the New Jerusalem in 1897. The General Church had split with the Swedenborgian Church of North America (sometimes known as the General Convention) in 1890 in a doctrinal dispute.

Publications
The Science of Exposition The Academy Book Room, Bryn Athyn, PA: 1915
Topics from the Writings The Academy Book Room, Bryn Athyn, PA: 1928
Notes and Papers on Ritual Academy of the New Church Book Room, Bryn Athyn, PA: 1956.
Confederate Memoirs, edited by Constance Pendleton, Bryn Athyn, PA: 1958

References

American religious leaders
American religious writers
1845 births
1927 deaths
People from Savannah, Georgia